Tammie Kaae (born 27 September 1975) is a Guamanian breaststroke and medley swimmer. She competed in two events at the 1992 Summer Olympics.

References

External links
 

1975 births
Living people
Guamanian female breaststroke swimmers
Guamanian female medley swimmers
Olympic swimmers of Guam
Swimmers at the 1992 Summer Olympics
Place of birth missing (living people)
21st-century American women